The Confederate Monument, also known as the Confederate Dead of Wilcox County, is an outdoor memorial in Camden, Alabama, in the United States. The monument was installed in 1880 by the Ladies Memorial and Wilcox Monumental Associations.

See also

 Confederate Monument (Fort Payne, Alabama)
 Confederate Monument (Ozark, Alabama)
 Confederate Monument (Troy, Alabama)
 List of Confederate monuments and memorials

References

1880 establishments in Alabama
1880 sculptures
Buildings and structures in Wilcox County, Alabama
Confederate States of America monuments and memorials in Alabama
Outdoor sculptures in Alabama